Terry White (born October 15, 1955) is an American sprint canoer who competed in the mid to late 1980s. Competing in two Summer Olympics, he earned his best finish of fourth in the K-2 1000 m event at Los Angeles in 1984.

Raised in Peru, Vermont, White attended Middlebury College.

References

Sports-Reference.com profile

1955 births
American male canoeists
Canoeists at the 1984 Summer Olympics
Canoeists at the 1988 Summer Olympics
Living people
Olympic canoeists of the United States
Middlebury College alumni
Sportspeople from Vermont